Providence is a town in Marengo County, Alabama, United States. As of the 2020 United States census, the population was 167, down from 223 at the 2010 census. It incorporated sometime in the 1970s.

Geography
Providence is located in north-central Marengo County at  (32.348986, -87.778309), along U.S. Route 43. It is bordered to the north by Chickasaw State Park.

Chickasaw Bogue, a small river, passes just south of the town, flowing west to the Tombigbee River.

Demographics

As of the census of 2000, there were 311 people, 124 households, and 99 families residing in the town. The racial makeup of the town was 83.92% White, 15.11% Black or African American and 0.96% Asian. 0.64% of the population were Hispanic or Latino of any race.

There were 124 households, out of which 36.3% had children under the age of 18 living with them, 54.8% were married couples living together, 18.5% had a female householder with no husband present, and 19.4% were non-families. 18.5% of all households were made up of individuals, and 8.1% had someone living alone who was 65 years of age or older. The average household size was 2.51 and the average family size was 2.81.

In the town, the population was spread out, with 27.0% under the age of 18, 8.0% from 18 to 24, 24.8% from 25 to 44, 26.4% from 45 to 64, and 13.8% who were 65 years of age or older. The median age was 35 years. For every 100 females, there were 95.6 males. For every 100 females age 18 and over, there were 84.6 males.

The median income for a household in the town was $33,542, and the median income for a family was $39,375. Males had a median income of $38,750 versus $24,821 for females. The per capita income for the town was $19,382. About 6.5% of families and 10.1% of the population were below the poverty line, including 18.2% of those under age 18 and 15.3% of those age 65 or over.

References

Towns in Alabama
Towns in Marengo County, Alabama